FTUC may refer to:

Fiji Trades Union Congress
Free Trade Union Committee